Sarfaraz Khan is an Indian-Canadian actor who worked in Hindi language films. He is the son of late actor Kader Khan.

Personal life
Khan was born on 22 April 1976 in Mumbai to veteran actor and writer Kader Khan and his wife Azra Khan. He has a brother, Shahnawaz Khan, who is also an actor.

Career
Khan has worked in two highly successful films, the tragic romance Tere Naam (2003), in which he played Aslam, friend of Salman Khan’s Radhe, and the action thriller Wanted (2009). In 2012, he formed the Kal Ke Kalakar International theatre company with his father and brother. In August 2012 it was announced that Khan would revive the 1990s music show, Antakshari, on Zee International.

Filmography

References

Living people
Male actors from Mumbai
Indian male film actors
1976 births